Derlin may refer to:

Science
 A family of membrane proteins
 Derlin-1 (Degradation in endoplasmic reticulum protein)
 Derlin-2
 Derlin-3

People
 Émile Derlin Zinsou (1918-2016), Beninese physician and president of Dahomey (now Benin)
 Bruce Derlin (born 1961), tennis player from New Zealand
 Roberto Derlin (1942–2021), Italian football player and manager

See also
 Delrin, a brand of Polyoxymethylene